Trolleybuses in Zlín and Otrokovice refers to a network of trolleybuses in the neighbouring Moravian towns of Zlín and Otrokovice and it is operated by the Zlín-Otrokovice Transport Company. Trolleybuses have been operating here since 1944, which makes Zlín the oldest trolleybus network in Moravia and the second oldest trolleybus transport network in the Czech Republic after Plzeň. It also makes it the fourth largest by size after Ostrava, Pardubice and České Budějovice.

References

Trolleybus systems by city
Trolleybus transport in the Czech Republic
Zlín